Sao Mi Zhou is a Chinese serial novel in 24 installments published in 1903 under the pseudonym Zhuàngzhě (壯者; lit. "strong man"). The word "superstition" had just been introduced in the Chinese language (from Japanese) a few years earlier by Liang Qichao. The novel attempted to convince people to oppose traditional Chinese religious ideas, which the author saw as backward and an obstacle to progress. Most of the novel is built around a discussion on the topic between two brothers.

References 

20th-century Chinese novels
Novels first published in serial form